"I Like Beer" is a song written and recorded by American country music artist Tom T. Hall. The song was released in August 1975 as the lead single from the album, I Wrote a Song About It. The song peaked at number 4 on the U.S. country singles chart and number 12 on the Canadian country singles chart.

Plot 
In the first verse, Hall explains that in previous songs of his, that he mentioned his fondness for beer, and for this song, he would like to make this explicit, praising its mood-mellowing effects and explaining in the chorus that he does not like the coarseness of whiskey, the cost of champagne or the effects vodka has on him (makes him run his mouth; ostensibly getting him in trouble). In the second verse, he takes joy in embarrassing his vermouth-drinking wife by yelling out for a beer. In the third verse, Hall tells of a dream he had of heaven, where the water tasted like beer before, to his disappointment, "they turned it all into wine."

Chart performance

References

External links 
 

1975 singles
Tom T. Hall songs
Songs written by Tom T. Hall
Song recordings produced by Jerry Kennedy
1975 songs
Mercury Records singles
Songs about alcohol